Cammin is a municipality  in the Rostock district, in Mecklenburg-Vorpommern, Germany.

Notable people 
 Gustav Bachmann (1860–1943) a German naval officer and an admiral in World War I

Gallery

References

External links